Robin Strömberg (born 23 January 1992) is a Swedish footballer.

He played four years at Mjällby AIF and two seasons at Östers IF. During the 2012 season, Strömberg had a loan spell at Icelandic club Þór Akureyri, where he scored three goals in eight matches.

References

External links

1992 births
Living people
Swedish footballers
Sweden youth international footballers
Association football midfielders
Mjällby AIF players
Þór Akureyri players
Östers IF players
Ljungskile SK players
Norrby IF players
Allsvenskan players
Úrvalsdeild karla (football) players
Superettan players
Ettan Fotboll players
Swedish expatriate footballers
Expatriate footballers in Iceland
Swedish expatriate sportspeople in Iceland